Finland–Poland relations refer to bilateral relations of Finland and Poland. Both countries are members of the European Union, OECD, OSCE, Council of the Baltic Sea States, HELCOM, Council of Europe and the World Trade Organization. Both countries established diplomatic relations on 8 March 1919. Poland is a full member of NATO, Finland is not a full member. Poland supports Finland's NATO membership.

History
Poland and Finland were once united by a personal union under the Polish–Swedish union during the reign of King Sigismund III Vasa.

In 1922, Poland and Finland were among signatories of the Warsaw Accord, which however did not enter into force, as Finland did not ratify it under pressure of Germany, which was hostile to Poland. Instead, in 1925, Poland and Finland together with Estonia and Latvia signed a convention on conciliation and arbitration in Helsinki.

In 1937–1938, both ethnic Poles and Finns in the Soviet Union were subjected to genocidal campaigns carried out by the NKVD, known as the Polish Operation and the Finnish Operation respectively.
In 1939, both countries were victims of the German-Soviet Molotov–Ribbentrop Pact, according to which they were to be divided into "spheres of influence" between Nazi Germany and the Soviet Union. After the subsequent German-Soviet invasion of Poland at the start of World War II, Polish diplomats and consuls with families (apart from those arrested by the Soviets) were evacuated from the Soviet Union to Finland in October 1939. Later on, in November 1939, Finland was also invaded by the Soviet Union. As a result of World War II, both Finland and Poland lost their eastern territories to the Soviet Union.

Finland and Poland co-hosted the 2021 Men's European Volleyball Championship.

In 2022, Finnish and Polish gas markets were connected, following the commissioning of the Balticconnector and GIPL interconnections, also providing Finland with a connection to the EU gas market. The Rail Baltica and Via Baltica, modern rail and road links of vital importance, connecting Finland with Poland and Central Europe, remain under construction (as of 2022).

Poland supports Finland's accession to NATO.

Economic relations
The value of two-way trade between Poland and Finland in 2015 totaled EUR 2.8 billion.

Agreements
The two countries have two agreements regarding environmental protection signed in 1990.

European Union
Finland joined the EU in 1995. Poland joined the EU in 2004.

NATO 
While Poland became a member of NATO in 1999, Finland has never been a member of NATO.

Resident diplomatic missions
 Finland has an embassy in Warsaw.
 Poland has an embassy in Helsinki.

Honorary consulates
There are honorary consulates of Finland in Białystok, Gdynia, Kielce, Kraków, Poznań, Szczecin, Toruń and Wrocław, and honorary consulates of Poland in Espoo, Jyväskylä, Kuopio, Tampere and Turku.

See also 
 Foreign relations of Finland
 Foreign relations of Poland
 Poles in Finland
 Finns in Poland

References

External links 
 Finnish Ministry of Foreign Affairs about the relation with Poland
 Polish embassy in Helsinki (in Finnish and Polish only)

 
Poland
Bilateral relations of Poland